The Chief Justice of Malaysia (Malay: Ketua Hakim Negara Malaysia), also known as the chief justice of the Federal Court, is the office and title of the head of the Malaysian judiciary system. The title has been in use since 1994, and prior to this it was known as the lord president of the Federal Court. The chief justice is the head of the Federal Court, the apex court of Malaysia. It is the highest position in Malaysian judicial system followed by the president of the Court of Appeal of Malaysia, chief judge of Malaya, and the chief judge of Sabah and Sarawak.

The current chief justice is Tengku Maimun Tuan Mat, since 2 May 2019.

Constitutional basis 
The office of Chief Justice of the Federal Court is established under Article 122 of the Constitution of Malaysia, which establishes the then-Supreme Court (now Federal Court) as consisting of a lord president (now chief justice), the chief judges of the High Courts and at least four other judges and such additional judges as may be appointed pursuant to Clause (1A).

Role 
The chief justice is first among equals among the judges of the Federal Court, and the position differs little from that of the other judges. All judges, including the chief justice, are appointed by the Yang di-Pertuan Agong (King of Malaysia), on the advice of the prime minister of Malaysia. Under Article 125 of the Malaysian Constitution, they can be removed only by the Yang di-Pertuan Agong, on a recommendation from a tribunal consisting of at least five judges who are current or former Federal Court judges. Reasons for removal include the chief justice:
 not following the Judges’ Code of Ethics; or
 being physically or mentally unable to carry out his or her duties.

The prime minister will then provide the Yang di-Pertuan Agong the reason(s) why the chief justice should be removed. The Yang di-Pertuan Agong will then proceed to set up the tribunal to make a decision.

Chief justices of Malaysia

See also 
 Courts of Malaysia
 2007 Royal Commission

References 

Chief Justices of Malaysia